The island of Ireland, comprising Northern Ireland and the Republic of Ireland, has an extensive network of tens of thousands of kilometres of public roads, usually surfaced. These roads have been developed and modernised over centuries, from trackways suitable only for walkers and horses, to surfaced roads including modern motorways. Driving is on the left-hand side of the road. The major routes were established before Irish independence and consequently take little cognisance of the border other than a change of identification number and street furniture. Northern Ireland has had motorways since 1962, and has a well-developed network of primary, secondary and local routes. The Republic started work on its motorway network in the early 1980s; and historically, the road network there was once somewhat less well developed. However, the Celtic Tiger economic boom and an influx of European Union structural funding, saw national roads and regional roads in the Republic come up to international standard quite quickly. In the mid-1990s, for example, the Republic went from having only a few short sections of motorway to a network of motorways, dual carriageways and other improvements on most major routes as part of a National Development Plan. Road construction in Northern Ireland now tends to proceed at a slower pace than in the Republic, although a number of important bypasses and upgrades to dual carriageway have recently been completed or are about to begin.

Roads in Northern Ireland are classified as either Highways, motorways (shown by the letter M followed by a route number, e.g. M1), A-roads (shown by the letter A followed by a route number, e.g. A6), B-roads (shown by the letter B followed by a route number, e.g. B135) and other roads. There are two types of A-roads: primary and non-primary.

Roads in the Republic are classified as motorways (shown by the letter M followed by a route number, e.g. M7), national roads (shown by the letter N followed by a route number, e.g. N25), regional roads (shown by the letter R followed by a route number, e.g. R611) and local roads (shown by the letter L followed by a route number, e.g. L4202). There are two types of national roads: national primary routes and national secondary routes.

Road signs in Northern Ireland follow the same design rules as the rest of the United Kingdom. Distance signposts in Northern Ireland show distances in miles, while all signposts placed in the Republic since the 1990s use kilometres. The Republic's road signs are generally bilingual, using both official languages, Irish and English. However, signs in the Gaeltacht (Irish speaking areas) use only Irish. The Irish language names are written in italic script, the English in capitals. Signs in Northern Ireland are in English only. Warning signs in the Republic have a yellow background and are diamond-shaped, those in Northern Ireland are triangle-shaped and have a white background with a red border.

Speed limits in Northern Ireland are specified in miles per hour. Those in the Republic use kilometres per hour (km/h), a change introduced on 20 January 2005. This involved the provision of 58,000 new metric speed limit signs, replacing and supplementing 35,000 imperial signs.

History

There have been routes and trackways in Ireland connecting settlements and facilitating trade since ancient times. Ireland was never part of the Roman Empire and, therefore, Roman roads were not built in Ireland. However, an Iron Age road with a stone surface has been excavated in Munster and togher roads, a type of causeway built through bogs, were found in many areas of the country.

According to an entry in the Annals of the Four Masters for AD 123, there were five principal highways leading to Tara in Early Medieval Ireland.

Early medieval law-tracts set out five types of road including the highway (slighe), the '[regional] main road' (ród or rout), the 'connecting road' (lámraite), the 'side road' (tógraite) which could be tolled, and the 'cow road' (bóthar). Bóthar is the most common term for 'road' in modern Irish: its diminutive form, bóithrín, (or boreen in English) is used as a term for very narrow, rural roads.

The development of roads in Ireland seemed to have stagnated until the eighteenth- and early nineteenth-centuries.  However, in the 18th century, a network of turnpike roads (charging tolls) was built: "a turnpike was a primitive form of turnstile – a gate across the road, opened on payment of a toll. The average length of a turnpike road was 30 miles". Routes to and from Dublin were developed initially and the network spread throughout the country. Turnpikes operated between 1729 and 1858 when the extensive railway network made them increasingly unpopular.

Specialist routes to facilitate the butter trade, which centred on Cork, were built in Munster. The first butter road was commissioned in 1748 and was built by John Murphy of Castleisland in County Kerry. In other areas, notably in County Wicklow, military roads were built to help secure British military control over remote areas. The Military Road through County Wicklow was begun in 1800 and completed in 1809. The R115 is part of the Military Road for its entire length.

Railways became the dominant form of land transport from the mid-19th century. This situation persisted until the first half of the 20th century when motorised road transport (cars, buses and trucks) gradually began to take over from railways as the most important form of land transport.

Pre-independence legislation (the Ministry of Transport Act, 1919) laid the foundation for the regulation of the modern system of public roads in Ireland.  The Act gave the Minister for Local Government the power to classify roads: Trunk Road Funds were used to enable local councils to improve major roads and road surfacing was gradually undertaken throughout the 1920s, 1930s and beyond.

By the 1950s an established system of road classification and numbering with Trunk Roads and Link Roads had long been developed. The present system of road classification and numbering began in 1977 when twenty-five National primary roads and thirty-three National secondary roads were designated.

Regional roads were first formally designated in 1994, although Regional road route-numbers began appearing on signposts in the 1980s.  The  Roads Act 1993 also classified all public roads which are not national or regional roads as local roads.

Roads in the Republic of Ireland

The Republic has an extensive network of public roads connecting all parts of the country.
As of 31 December 2013, there was a total of 7,959.309 km (4945 miles) of national roads: of which 5,305.56 km (3297 miles) were national primary routes (including motorways) and 2,653.749 km (1649 miles) were national secondary routes.

By May 2018 Network Lengths were as follows.

National Primary Roads (including motorways) 2,717 km (1689 miles)

National Secondary Roads 2,696 km (1675 miles)

Total National Road N (and M) Network 5,413 km (3363 miles)

In addition to national roads, the Republic also has an extensive network of other public roads: there are:

13,124 kilometres (8155 miles) of Regional Roads R and
81,300 kilometres (50,500 miles) of Local L roads.

Local Roads are broken into three classes,

Local Primary (LP) 23,789 km (14782 miles),
Local Secondary (LS) 33,366 km (20733 miles) and
Local Tertiary LT 23,789 km (14782 miles)

For a combined public road network length of 99,830 km (62,030 miles) in 2018

The Republic's major road network is focused on Dublin. Motorways were extended from Dublin to other major cities as part of the Transport 21 programme which aimed to have a world-class motorway network in place by the end of 2010. At that time, Ireland's main cities (Cork, Limerick, Galway, Waterford and Belfast) excluding Derry were connected to Dublin with motorways or with near-motorway standard roads. Dublin was the focus of some other major projects, such as the East-Link and West-Link toll-bridges, as well as the Dublin Port Tunnel. Major by-pass projects were also built around other cities and towns. The Jack Lynch Tunnel under the River Lee in Cork was a major project outside Dublin, and a fourth crossing at Limerick under the River Shannon (known as the Limerick Tunnel) opened in 2010.

The different classes of roads in Ireland are allocated blocks of numbers so that no number is used more than once save in the case of Local Primary Roads.(not all road numbers are currently in use):
 National Primary Roads are numbered from N1 to N50 (motorway sections are signed with M prefix instead of N ).
 National Secondary Roads are numbered from N51 to N99.
 Regional Roads are numbered from R100 to R999.
 Local Primary Roads are numbered from L1000 to L4999.
 Local Secondary Roads are numbered from L5000 to L8999.
 Local Tertiary Roads are numbered from L10001 to L89999 with the first 4 digits representing the Local Primary or Secondary road it starts off from. Local Tertiary roads which are unrelated to a Local Primary or Secondary road are given numbers from L90000 up.

Motorways

In the Republic of Ireland, a motorway forms part of a national primary route, but is indicated by the prefix M instead of N. Motorways are the highest standard roads and certain drivers and vehicles are prohibited from using them. The motorway network has been expanded extensively since the 1990s, through construction of new motorways and redesignation of existing motorway-standard dual-carriageway sections of National Primary routes.

The first motorway section in the state was the M7 Naas by-pass, which opened in 1983. Since 2009, all motorways in Ireland are part of, or form, national primary roads.

As of 2019, the following motorway routes are in operation:
 M1, part of the DublinBelfast route: from M50 J3 at Dublin Airport to Thistle Cross (just north of Dundalk), where it reverts to the N1 numbering as a dual carriageway up to the border with Northern Ireland, where it continues without interruption as the A1 dual carriageway to a junction with Northern Ireland's M1 and on to Belfast.
 M2, part of the DublinDerry/Letterkenny route: from just north of M50 J5 to just north of Ashbourne, County Meath, (where it reverts to a single-carriageway road (N2) as far as the border, then continues as the A5 to Derry or recrosses the border to become the N14 to Letterkenny).
 M3, part of the DublinCavan/Enniskillen/Donegal route: from Clonee (on N3 from M50 J6) to Kells bypass. The route continues as the N3 as far as the border, then becomes the A509 to Enniskillen, whereupon it is renumbered the A46 to the border at Belleek and resumes its N3 identity as far as Ballyshannon on the N15 SligoDonegal road.
 M4, part of the DublinSligo route: from Lucan (on N4 from M50 J7) to Kinnegad at which point it reverts to dual carriageway to (bypass) Mullingar.
 M6, part of the DublinGalway route: leaves M4 at J11 near Kinnegad, ending at the R381 crossing where it reverts to the N6 dual carriageway around Galway.  The section around Athlone reverts to N6 status as it is an all-traffic dual carriageway. This was the first city-to-city motorway link in Ireland. Opened in January 2010.
 M7, part of the DublinLimerick route: begins at the Naas bypass at the end of the N7 Naas Road dual carriageway from M50 J9 and continues to Rossbrien outside Limerick where the motorway forms an interchange with the N18 & M20 routes at junction 30.
 M8, part of the DublinCork route: branches off the M7 at junction 19 and continues to the Dunkettle interchange outside Cork where it forms an interchange with the N25 and N40 routes.
 M9, part of the DublinWaterford route: branches off the M7 at junction 11 and continues towards the Quarry Roundabout outside Waterford where it forms a junction with the N24.
 M11, two separate parts of the DublinWexford route: the southern tip of the M50 to the west side of Bray and from Coyne's Cross to just north of Oilgate.
 M17, part of the GalwaySligo route: begins at junction 18 on the M6 and continues to a terminus roundabout on the outskirts of Tuam. Continues northbound towards Sligo as the N17.
 M18, part of the Limerick Ennis - Galway route: begins at junction 9 for Shannon Airport from the N18 dual carriageway from the Rossbrien Interchange in Limerick and continues to junction 18 with a junction on the M6 for Galway.
 M20, part of the CorkLimerick route: branches off the M7 at junction 30 and the N18 at junction 1 at the Rossbrien interchange outside Limerick and continues for 10 km (6 miles) towards Attyflin near Patrickswell at junction 4. Here the route forms an interchange with the N20 towards Cork and the N21 to Tralee & Killarney. Both the N20 & N21 from here are single carriageway.
 M50, 45 km (28 miles) C – shaped ring road that forms a bypass of Dublin. The motorway connects to all the national primary routes from Dublin to the main cities and regions of Ireland as well as Dublin City centre.

In June 2007, it was announced that around 800 kilometres (500 miles) of 'new' motorway would be created; however, much of this resulted from the re-classification of most of the country's high-quality dual carriageways to motorway regulations rather than the construction of purpose-built motorways. This affected most of the major inter-urban routes between Dublin and various towns and cities and some of the Atlantic Corridor along the Western seaboard.

Planned motorways
 M20; Completion of the upgrading of the N20 route between Cork and Limerick to motorway standard. This will extend the existing section of M20 outside Limerick to Cork.

By 2015, TII planned that there would be approximately 1090 km (680 miles) of motorway in Ireland, comprising the M50 (45.55 km (28 miles)), M20 (90 km (55 miles) approx), M18 (70 km (45 miles) approx), M17 (25.5 km (15 miles)), M11 (62 km (39 miles)), M9 (116.5 km (72 miles)), M8 (147 km (91 miles)), M7 (185 km (115 miles)), M6 (144 km (90 miles)), M4 (62 km (39 miles)), M3 (57 km (35 miles)), M2 (13 km (8 miles)), and M1 (89 km (55 miles)). However the Irish financial crisis brought this target into question.

National primary roads

National Primary routes form the main cross country roads in Ireland and include all motorways. This category of road is numbered from 1–50 with the prefix "N" (or "M" for motorway sections). The routes numbered N1-N11 radiate anti-clockwise from Dublin, with those in the range N12-N26 being cross-country roads and N27-N33 being newer short link roads. The N40 is the Cork Ring Road and the N50 is the Dublin Ring Road. National secondary roads (see next section) are numbered under the same scheme with higher numbers. On road signage, destinations served but not on the route in question are listed in brackets, with the connecting route also listed (see thumbnail).

Northern Ireland route sections (which are classified separately according to NI schemes) are in some cases included in a theoretical complete cross-border route – for example the N3 route, which re-enters the Republic. These are listed here in brackets for completeness (and are present on southern road signage).

This list ignores the sections of route reclassified as motorway (see previous section).

National secondary roads

National secondary roads fill in the rest of the main cross country routes in Ireland. They connect large towns (such as Birr) which are not served by National Primary routes, and some routes (such as N59) follow long coastal route connecting many towns. They are indicated with a "N" prefix followed by a number from 51 to 99 (N87 is currently the highest).

There are 2683.974 km (1668 miles) of national secondary roads in Ireland, making up slightly less than 50% of the entire national route (national primary and national secondary) network. National secondary routes are generally more poorly maintained than primary routes (although their quality can vary widely), but often carry more traffic than regional roads. Almost the entire network of national secondary roads is single carriageway, although there are some short sections of dual carriageway on the Tallaght bypass section of the N81, on the N52 at Dundalk, on the N85 at Ennis, on the N62 at Athlone and on the N71 between Cork and Bandon. Typically, national secondary roads are of a similar standard or higher than regional roads although some are of lower quality than the better sections of regional roads. Many of them have been resurfaced with higher quality pavements in recent years with relatively smooth surfaces and good road markings and signposting. However, road widths and alignments are often inadequate, with many narrow and winding sections.

National secondary roads generally do not bypass towns on their routes although there are a number of exceptions: the N52 bypasses Nenagh, Mullingar and the centre of Dundalk (as a relief road) with a further N52 bypass of Tullamore planned, the N55 (along with the N3) bypasses Cavan, the N56 forms part of the Donegal bypass, the N61 and the N63 bypass Roscommon, the N71 bypasses Halfway and Skibbereen, the N74 bypasses Cashel, the N76 bypasses Callan, the N77 forms the northern part of the Kilkenny ring road, the N80 bypasses Carlow and the N85 bypasses Ennis. When the Fermoy (Moorepark) to Kilbehenny section of the M8 was completed, the former N8 bypass of Mitchelstown was re-classified as the N73.

Examples of national secondary roads are:
N52 Dundalk via Mullingar and Birr to Nenagh joining M7 to Limerick
N59 Galway – Clifden – Westport – Bangor Erris – Ballina – Ballysadare
N62 Athlone – Horse and Jockey
N74 Cashel – Golden – Tipperary Town
N81 Dublin – Tullow
N86 Tralee – Dingle via Lispole

Alternative National roads
Alternative National roads are regional roads which provide an alternative route to a national route. A large amount of national primary routes have been replaced by motorways, which certain drivers and vehicles are prohibited from using. These regional roads provide an alternative route to the motorway for these drivers. They are usually the former national road which was downgraded following the opening of the motorway. In 2010 new signage was introduced for alternative routes. They are signposted in black on a yellow background, instead of black on a white background for other regional roads. This new signage has been installed on most roads, being included when signage was replaced. Roads where the new signage has been installed include the R132 in Swords (alternative to M1), the R147 in Dunshaughlin (alternative to M3), the entire length of the R448 (alternative to M9), the R712 in Paulstown (alternative to N10) and the R772 from Rathnew to Arklow (alternative to M11).

Regional roads

Regional Roads fill in the rest of the main roads in Ireland. They connect many small towns to each other and to the national road network. There are over 11,600 kilometres (7200 miles) of regional roads. Regional roads are numbered with three digit route numbers, prefixed by "R" (e.g. R105). Route numbers range from R1xx in the north-east to R7xx in the south-east of the country, with newer short urban roads numbered R8xx and R9xx. They are signposted in black with a white background. Some of the more important regional roads such as the R136 Outer Orbital, Dublin and the R710 Waterford Outer Ring Road are dual-carriageway in whole or part. Most regional roads are however single carriageway roads, and many are rather narrow country roads.

Regional roads are subject to a general speed limit of 80 km/h (50 mph) or 50 km/h (30 mph) in built-up areas.

While funding for national primary roads is administered centrally by Transport Infrastructure Ireland (TII), regional and local roads are less well funded (although funding has increased in the 2000s). Local councils are responsible for these roads, as opposed to TII.

Local roads

All public roads which are not motorways, national roads or regional roads are local roads: "a public road, other than a national road or a regional road, shall be a local road".

Local roads vary greatly in quality, from wide urban streets to very narrow, rural lanes, known as boreens in Ireland. There are three types of Local road: Local Primary (local roads wider than 4 metres (13')), Local Secondary (local roads narrower than 4 metres (13')) and Local Tertiary (cul-de-sacs and other minor roads).

Local roads are subject to a general speed limit of 80 km/h (50 mph) or 50 km/h (30 mph) in built-up areas. While this is the maximum speed allowed, drivers must adhere to the Road Traffic Act and drive with due care and attention and with regard to the road conditions.

Local roads are not generally referred to by number, but are registered with a four- or five-digit "L" number, taking the form Lxxxx. It used to be rare to see these numbers on signposts (and these numbers do not appear on Ordnance Survey maps), but in 2006 the Department of the Environment, Heritage and Local Government began a programme of new signage for regional roads that incorporates local road numbers on directional signage (see thumbnails).

Old system

The Republic of Ireland had a different road numbering system prior to the introduction of the National Route numbering system.

Major roads were marked with "T" for Trunk Road, less important roads were marked with "L" for Link Road.

The first nine Trunk Roads (T1, T2, T3, T4, T4a, T5, T6, T7, T8) radiated out from Dublin (with the T8 branching off the T7 at Enniscorthy) and followed an anti-clockwise pattern. This pattern was similar to the existing anti-clockwise pattern which the routes radiating out of Dublin follow.

Unlike the present system, where each road (whether N- or R-) has a unique number, under the Trunk/Link system, the L-roads were numbered separately beginning with L1. These L (for Link Road) classifications are not related to the current Lxxxx numbers for Local Roads. Confusingly, some old road signs still show the former (now obsolete) road numbers.

Trunk Roads were broadly equivalent to the present National Roads, and Link Roads to the present Regional Roads. Most of the National Primary and National Secondary routes had been Trunk Roads and generally they followed the routes of these Trunk roads, albeit with a different numbering system. However, some National Primary and Secondary roads also incorporated Link Roads and unclassified roads into their routes. Furthermore, many Trunk Roads were downgraded to Regional roads, effectively 'de-trunked'. Some newer National Primary routes were built as new roads in the 1990s and therefore did not incorporate former Trunk, Link or unclassified roads into their routes.

Former major trunk roads in Ireland and current equivalents

T1 = Dublin – north of Dundalk (Belfast). Mainly present R132, old N1; largely replaced by M1
T2 = Dublin – north of Monaghan (Derry). Mainly present N2 road
T3 = Dublin–Sligo. Mainly present N4 road
T4 = Dublin–Galway. Mainly present N6 road (& R348).
T5 = Dublin–Limerick. Mainly present N7 road
T6 = Dublin–Cork. Including parts of present N9 road, N8 road and N30 road
T7 = Dublin–Waterford. Mainly present N11 road
T8 = Enniscorthy–Rosslare. Mainly part of present N11 road and N25 road.
T11 = Cork–Sligo. Mainly present N20 road, N18 road and N17 road
T12 = Cork–Wexford. Mainly present N25 road
T13 = Limerick–Waterford. Mainly present N24 road
T18 = Sligo – near Strabane (Derry). Mainly present N15 road
T28 = Limerick–Tralee. Mainly present N21 road
T29 = Cork–Tralee. Mainly present N22 road
T35 = Dublin–Cavan–Donegal. Mainly present N3 road
T77 = Dublin–Ballina. Mainly parts of present N5 road & N26 road

Roads in Northern Ireland

The main roads in Northern Ireland, which connect well with those in the Republic, are classified "M"/"A"/"B" as in Great Britain. Whereas the roads in Great Britain are numbered according to a zonal system, there is no available explanation for the allocation of road numbers in Northern Ireland, though their numbering is separate from the system in England, Scotland and Wales.

European routes
The following European routes include sections in Ireland:

E1 – Larne – Belfast – Dublin – Rosslare – A Coruña – Pontevedra – Valença do Minho – Vila Real de Santo António – Huelva – Sevilla
E16 – Derry – Belfast ... Glasgow – Edinburgh ... Bergen – Arna – Voss ... Lærdal – Tyin – Fagernes – Hønefoss – Sandvika – Oslo
 E18 – Craigavon – Belfast – Larne ... Stranraer – Gretna – Carlisle – Newcastle ... Kristiansand – Arendal – Porsgrunn – Larvik – Sandefjord – Horten – Drammen – Oslo – Askim – Karlstad – Örebro – Västerås – Stockholm/Kapellskär ... Mariehamn ... Turku/Naantali – Helsinki – Kotka – Vaalimaa – Vyborg – Saint Petersburg
E20 – Shannon – Limerick – Dublin ... Liverpool – Manchester – Leeds – Kingston upon Hull ... Esbjerg – Copenhagen – Malmö – Helsingborg – Halmstad – Gothenburg – Örebro – Stockholm ... Tallinn – Narva – Saint Petersburg
E30 – Cork – Waterford – Wexford – Rosslare ... Fishguard – Swansea – Cardiff – Newport – Bristol – London – Colchester – Ipswich – Felixstowe ... Hook of Holland – The Hague – Gouda – Utrecht – Amersfoort – Oldenzaal – Osnabrück – Bad Oeynhausen – Hanover – Braunschweig – Magdeburg – Berlin – Świebodzin – Poznań – Warsaw – Brest – Minsk – Smolensk – Moscow – Ryazan – Penza – Samara – Ufa – Chelyabinsk – Kurgan – Ishim – Omsk
E201 – Cork – Portlaoise

See also
Transport in Ireland
Transport Infrastructure Ireland
Vehicle registration plates of Ireland
Vehicle registration plates of Northern Ireland
Road signs in the Republic of Ireland
Road speed limits in the Republic of Ireland
List of toll roads in the Republic of Ireland
List of roads of County Mayo

References
S.I. No. 209/1994: Roads Act, 1993 (Declaration of National Roads) Order, 1994 (revoked)
 S.I. No. 49 of 1995 Roads Act, 1993 (Declaration of National Roads) Order, 1995 (revoked)
 S.I. No. 347 of 1996 Roads Act, 1993 (Declaration of National Roads) Order, 1996 (revoked)
 S.I. No. 26 of 2003 Roads Act, 1993 (Classification of National Roads) (Kilcock – Kinnegad Route) Order, 2003 (revoked)
 S.I. No. 249 of 2004 Roads Act, 1993 (Classification of National Roads) (Fermoy, Rathcormac and Watergrass Hill) Order, 2004 (revoked)
 S.I. No. 18 of 2004 Roads Act, 1993 (Classification of National Roads) (Gormanstown to Dundalk Route) Order, 2004 (revoked)
Roads Act 1993 (Classification of National Roads) Order 2006 - Department of Transport

External links

 Roads Service – Northern Ireland
 National Roads Authority (Republic of Ireland)
 A discussion on RTÉ Radio One's science show Quantum Leap about the quality of GPS mapping in Ireland is available here.  The discussion starts 8mins 17sec into the show. It was aired on 18 January 2007 Requires RealPlayer.

 
 
Road transport in Ireland